The Bank of North America was the first chartered bank in the United States, and served as the country's first de facto central bank. Chartered by the Congress of the Confederation on May 26, 1781, and opened in Philadelphia on January 7, 1782, it was based upon a plan presented by Superintendent of Finance Robert Morris on May 17, 1781, based on recommendations by Revolutionary era figure Alexander Hamilton. Although Hamilton later noted its "essential" contribution to the war effort, the Pennsylvania government objected to its privileges and reincorporated it under state law, making it unsuitable as a national bank under the federal Constitution. Instead Congress chartered a new bank, the First Bank of the United States, in 1791, while the Bank of North America continued as a private concern.

Revolutionary war period

Congressional charter 

In May 1781 Alexander Hamilton revealed that he had recommended Robert Morris for the position of Superintendent of Finance of the United States the previous summer when the constitution of the Articles of Confederation-era executive was being solidified. Second, he proceeded to lay out a proposal for a national bank that would also serve as a de facto central bank. Morris, who had corresponded with Hamilton previously on the subject of funding the war, immediately drafted a legislative proposal based on Hamilton's suggestion and submitted it to the Congress. Morris persuaded Congress to charter the Bank of North America, the first private commercial bank in the United States. His friend, Dr. Hugh Shiell, paid £5000 to the capital stock.

Stock offering 
The original charter as outlined by Hamilton called for the disbursement of 1,000 shares priced at $400 each. Benjamin Franklin purchased a single token share as a sign of good faith to Federalists and their new bank. Hamilton used his pseudonym  "Publius" (later immortalized in the Federalist Papers advocating in the late 1780s for adoption of the United States Constitution) to endorse the bank.

William Bingham, rumored to be the richest man in America after the Revolutionary War, purchased 9.5% of the available shares.

The greatest share, however, 63.3%, was purchased on behalf of the United States government by Robert Morris using a gift in the form of a loan from France, and a loan from the Netherlands. This had the effect of capitalizing the bank with large deposits of gold and silver coin and bills of exchange. He then issued new paper currency backed by this supply.

Officers 
Thomas Willing, a twice former mayor of Philadelphia and partner with Morris in an import-export firm that once dominated the city's slave trade, was named the bank's first president.  He held that office from 1781 to 1791, being succeeded by John Nixon, and moving immediately on to become the first president of the First Bank of the United States, a position he held from 1791 to 1807.

Banknotes 
The bank issued its own notes that superseded the troubled Continental currency bills. These notes were printed on paper with colored fibers pressed into the reverse side as an anti-counterfeiting measure. Unlike the Continental bills, the new notes carried a promise to pay silver on demand. Despite these changes, the bank had difficulty at first persuading people of its good credit, and at one point it employed repossessors to follow people who redeemed notes and urge them to deposit the money back. To promote the impression that it had a large reserve, the bank made a spectacle of raising and lowering cash boxes to and from its cellar. Once the stock was fully subscribed and paid, doubts subsided and the notes rose to par value. By 1783, several states including Massachusetts enacted legislation allowing Americans to pay taxes with Bank of North America notes, giving them a crucial aspect of legal tender.

Private bank 

In the economic turmoil that followed the Revolutionary War, the bank's strictness in collecting debts drew opposition from Pennsylvania residents, who petitioned the General Assembly to revoke the state charter granted to it in 1782. This was done in 1785, although the bank continued to operate with difficulty under its congressional charter and then under a Delaware charter. The following year the Assembly granted a new charter with several restrictions, including that it could not trade any merchandise other than bullion. The Bank of North America, along with the First Bank of the United States and the Bank of New York were the first shares traded on the New York Stock Exchange.

After the passage of the National Bank Act in 1862, the Bank of North America converted its business to operate under the new law. Its unique history presented a problem: the act required a national bank to include the word "national" in its name. The bank's management considered its original name a matter of prestige and took the position that the name remained fixed by the Confederation and state charters. The Comptroller of the Currency chose not to press these legal questions and admitted the bank without a name change.

The bank merged in 1923 with the Commercial Trust Company to become the Bank of North America and Trust Company, which merged in 1929 with the Pennsylvania Company for Insurances on Lives and Granting Annuities. That company (as the Pennsylvania Company for Banking and Trust) merged with the First National Bank (Philadelphia) in 1955 to become The First Pennsylvania Banking and Trust Company. This was later acquired by CoreStates Financial Corporation (1991), First Union/Wachovia (1998) and Wells Fargo (2008).

See also 
 Congressional charter

References

Further reading

External links 
 The Bank of North America, Philadelphia, a National Bank, Founded 1781: The Story of Its Progress through the Last Quarter of a Century, 1881–1906, by Robert Grier Cooke Incorporated (1906).
 Debates and Proceedings of the General Assembly of Pennsylvania, on the Memorials Praying a Repeal of Suspension of the Law Annulling the Charter of the Bank (ed. Mathew Carey, 1786).
 A History of the Bank of North America, the First Bank Chartered in the United States, by Lawrence Lewis, Jr. (J. B. Lippincott & Co. 1882).
 Legislative and Documentary History of the Bank of the United States: Including the Original Bank of North America, by Matthew St. Clair Clarke and David A. Hall. This collection of documents was aimed to include the entire proceedings, debates, and resolutions of Congress relating to the Bank of North America, the First (1791–1811) Bank of the United States, and the Second (1816–1836) Bank of the United States. These documents were compiled four years before the closing of the Second Bank.
 Legislative and Documentary History of the Banks of the United States, from the Time of Establishing the Bank of North America, 1781, to October 1834; with Notes and Comments, by R. K. Moulton. An attempt to compile all the public documents considered to be essential in attaining a thorough knowledge of the national banking operations of the United States, from 1781 to 1834.

1781 establishments in Pennsylvania
1929 disestablishments in Pennsylvania
American companies established in 1781
American companies disestablished in 1929
Banks based in Pennsylvania
Banks established in 1781
Banks disestablished in 1929
Corporations chartered by the United States Congress
Former central banks
History of banking
Ordinances of the Continental Congress